The International Day for Biological Diversity (or World Biodiversity Day) is a United Nations–sanctioned international day for the promotion of biodiversity issues.  It is currently held on May 22.

The International Day for Biological Diversity falls within the scope of the UN Post-2015 Development Agenda's Sustainable Development Goals. In this larger initiative of international cooperation, the topic of biodiversity concerns stakeholders in sustainable agriculture; desertification, land degradation and drought; water and sanitation; health and sustainable development; energy; science, technology and innovation, knowledge-sharing and capacity-building; urban resilience and adaptation; sustainable transport; climate change and disaster risk reduction; oceans and seas; forests; vulnerable groups including indigenous peoples; and food security. The critical role of biodiversity in sustainable development was recognized in a Rio+20 outcome document, "The World We Want: A Future for All".

From its creation by the Second Committee of the UN General Assembly in 1993 until 2000, it was held on December 29 to celebrate the day the Convention on Biological Diversity went into effect. On December 20, 2000, the date was shifted to commemorate the adoption of the Convention on May 22, 1992, at the Rio de Janeiro Earth Summit, and partly to avoid the many other holidays that occur in late December.

Theme

See also
 United Nations Decade on Biodiversity (2011–2020)
 International Year of Biodiversity (2010)

References

External links
 Post-2015 Development Agenda
 Considering Man's Place in the World," May 22, 2014
 Sustainable Development Goals
 "The World We Want: A Future for All"

Biodiversity
Convention on Biological Diversity
Biological
May observances
Recurring events established in 1993
Biological Diversity, International Day for